G. ferruginea may refer to:
 Gallicolumba ferruginea, the Tanna ground dove, an extinct dove species from Vanuatu
 Guatteria ferruginea, a plant species endemic to Suriname

See also
 Ferruginea (disambiguation)